Dorcadionoides subaeneus is a species of beetle in the family Cerambycidae, and the only species in the genus Dorcadionoides. It was described by Victor Motschulsky in 1857.

References

Lamiinae
Beetles described in 1857